Missing Mom is a 2005 novel by American writer Joyce Carol Oates about the murder of a middle-aged widow.

Plot 
Nikki Eaton, a 31-year-old journalist in a small town in New York state, deals with the murder of her widowed mother, Gwen, by a meth addict, while having an affair with a married man and clashing with her more conventional older sister.

Reception 
Stacey D'Erasmo in The New York Times noted the themes of feminism and class politics in the novel and praised it as "more disturbing" than Oates's typical crime fiction. Kirkus Reviews was negative, calling the novel "irrationally bloated" and based on a "banal premise".

References 

2005 American novels
Novels by Joyce Carol Oates
Ecco Press books
American crime novels